is a railway station on the Ban'etsu East Line in the city of Iwaki, Fukushima Prefecture, Japan operated by East Japan Railway Company (JR East).

Lines
Ogawagō Station is served by the Ban'etsu East Line, and is located 10.3 rail kilometers from the official starting point of the line at Iwaki Station in Fukushima

Station layout
The station has a single island platform connected to the station building by an underground passage. The station is unattended.

Platforms

History
Ogawagō Station opened on July 10, 1915. The station was absorbed into the JR East network upon the privatization of the Japanese National Railways (JNR) on April 1, 1987.

Surrounding area

Ogawa Post office
former Ogawa Town Hall

See also
 List of Railway Stations in Japan

References

External links

  

Stations of East Japan Railway Company
Railway stations in Fukushima Prefecture
Ban'etsu East Line
Railway stations in Japan opened in 1915
Iwaki, Fukushima